Oi (Oy, Oey; also known as The, Thang Ong, Sok) is an Austroasiatic dialect cluster of Attapeu Province, southern Laos. The dominant variety is Oy proper, with 11,000 speakers who are 80% monolinguals. The Jeng (Cheng) speak the same language but are ethnically distinct (Sidwell 2003). Speakers follow traditional religions.

Distribution
Some locations where Oi is spoken in include (Sidwell 2003:26):
Ban Sok, 40 km north of Attapeu
Ban Lagnao, 10 km northwest of Attapeu
Ban Inthi, 25 km southwest of Attapeu; speakers claim to have migrated from the Bolaven Plateau about 80 years ago, around the time of the Ong Kommandam Rebellion.
Ban Mai, at the southern slope of the Bolaven Plateau
Ban Champao, at the southern slope of the Bolaven Plateau
Sepian forest, as far as the Khampo River
The Jeng live mostly along the banks of the Sekaman River, in and around Ban Fandeng (Phandɛŋ).

References

External links 
Sidwell, Paul (2003). A Handbook of comparative Bahnaric, Vol. 1: West Bahnaric. Pacific Linguistics, 551. Canberra: Research School of Pacific and Asian Studies, Australian National University.
http://projekt.ht.lu.se/rwaai RWAAI (Repository and Workspace for Austroasiatic Intangible Heritage)
http://hdl.handle.net/10050/00-0000-0000-0003-903F-3@view Oi in RWAAI Digital Archive
http://hdl.handle.net/10050/00-0000-0000-0003-9041-C@view Sapuar in RWAAI Digital Archive

Bahnaric languages
Languages of Laos